Goleba punctata is a species of jumping spider in the genus Goleba. The species has been identified in Madagascar. The female was first described by George Peckham, Elizabeth Peckham and W.H. Wheeler in 1889. Initially placed in the genus Asemonea, the species was moved to Goleba in 1980 by Fred Wanless.

References

Salticidae
Spiders described in 1889
Spiders of Madagascar